František Dvořák (21 January 1871 – 30 December 1939) was a Czech fencer. He competed at the 1920 and 1924 Summer Olympics.

References

External links
 

1871 births
1939 deaths
Czech male fencers
Czechoslovak male fencers
Olympic fencers of Czechoslovakia
Fencers at the 1920 Summer Olympics
Fencers at the 1924 Summer Olympics